A charnel house is a facility for storing human remains in skeleton form

Charnel House or variation, may also refer to:

 The Charnel House, a painting by Pablo Picasso
 The Charnel House (film), a 2016 U.S. dark fantasy horror film
 Charnel House (publisher), a U.S. horror fiction publisher
 Charnel House, a poetic graphic novel with art by Tom de Freston
 The Charnel House, a novel by Eamonn McGrath

See also

 

 House (disambiguation)
 Tomb (disambiguation)
 Crypt (disambiguation)
 Catacomb (disambiguation)